The  Philippine Constitutional Convention of 1971 was called to change the 1935 Constitution of the Philippines.  The delegates were elected on November 10, 1970, and the convention itself was convened on June 1, 1971. It was marked by controversies, including efforts to uphold term limits for incumbent President Ferdinand Marcos, and a bribery scandal in which 14 people, including First Lady Imelda Marcos, were accused of bribing delegates to favor the Marcoses.

Marcos declared martial law in September 1972, and had 11 opposition delegates arrested. The remaining opposition delegates were forced to go either into exile or hiding.  Within two months, an entirely new draft of the constitution was created from scratch by a special committee.  The 1973 constitutional plebiscite was called to ratify the new constitution, but the validity of the ratification was brought to question because Marcos replaced the method of voting through secret ballot with a system of viva voce voting by "citizens' assemblies". The ratification of the constitution was challenged in what came to be known as the Ratification Cases.

Background

The 1935 Constitution 
By the middle of the 1930s, the end of the American occupation of the Philippines was supposed to be in sight. In 1934 the US had approved a ten-year plan for the Philippines' transition from a commonwealth to a fully independent nation-state, based on the Jones Act of 1916.  One of the preconditions for this independence was the creation of "a stable democratic government" based on the American model of governance, rather than being based on the French model as the Malolos Constitution had been.

Although World War II interfered with the transition plan and a puppet constitution was put in place by the Japanese Imperial Army from 1943 until the defeat of the Japanese forces in 1944, the Philippines was granted independence on July 4, 1946.  Upon independence, the 1935 constitution came into effect, featuring a government structure very similar to that of the United States: an executive branch with a President who could be elected to a maximum of two four-year terms; a bicameral legislature consisting of a congress and a senate; and an independent judicial branch.

Campaign to change the 1935 Constitution 
In 1967, the executive branch was headed by the tenth president, Ferdinand Marcos.  Expressing opposition to the administration's policies and citing rising discontent over wide inequalities in society, critics of Marcos began campaigning to change a constitution which they said had been written under the dominion of the country's former colonial overlords.  On March 16 of that year, the Philippine Congress constituted itself into a Constituent Assembly and passed Resolution No. 2, which called for a Constitutional Convention to change the 1935 Constitution.

Marcos surprised his critics by endorsing the move, and it was later revealed that the resulting Constitutional Convention would lay the foundation for the legal justifications Marcos would use to extend his term past the two four-year terms allowable under the 1935 Constitution.

Convention leadership and members 

A special election was held on November 10, 1970, to elect the delegates of the convention. Once the winners had been determined, the convention was convened on June 1, 1971, at the then-newly completed Quezon City Hall.

Former Philippine President Carlos P. Garcia was sworn in as the President of the Constitutional Convention on the day the convention was convened, but died thirteen days after taking oath. Former President Diosdado Macapagal replaced Garcia. Sotero H. Laurel served as the President Pro-Tempore of the convention.

A total of 320 delegates were elected to the convention, the most prominent being former senators Raul Manglapus and Roseller T. Lim. Other delegates would become influential political figures, including Hilario Davide, Jr., Marcelo Fernan, Sotero Laurel, Aquilino Pimentel, Jr., Teofisto Guingona, Jr., Raul Roco, Edgardo Angara, Richard Gordon, Margarito Teves, and Federico Dela Plana.

Proposal of "Ban Marcos" provisions 
Even as far back as 1967, when the creation of the Constitutional Convention was proposed, opposition politicians feared that Marcos would use the convention as a way to stay in power beyond the two four-year terms allowed him by the 1935 Constitution.  Because of these fears, the original resolution in congress which called for the convention had a provision that would have required the proposed new Constitution to have a provision preventing Marcos or his wife Imelda from running for office after the end of his term in 1973.  The provision was defeated in Congress by a narrow vote.

Members of the opposition who were elected as Constitutional Convention delegates nevertheless proposed such "Ban the Marcoses" provisions during the deliberations of the convention.

Soon after the Constitutional Convention was convened, 176 of the 206 delegates signed a resolution by delegate Napoleon Rama calling for a ban on the Marcoses. Later, the Committee on Suffrage and Election Reforms, chaired by Raul Manglapus, drafted a resolution which read:
No person who has served as President of the Philippines shall be eligible to occupy the same office or that of chief minister or chief executive any time in the future, nor shall his spouse or relatives to the second degree by consanguinity or affinity be eligible to occupy the same office during any unexpired portion of his term or in one immediately succeeding term.

Deliberations on these provisions dragged out due to partisan rambling, continuing until Marcos' declaration of martial law in September 1972. Rama was put in jail along with 10 other members of the opposition bloc, while numerous others, including Manglapus, were forced into hiding or exile. They were dropped from the Marcos-sponsored final draft of the constitution which was approved by the convention in November 1972.

Eduardo Quintero's delegate bribery exposé 
Already bogged down by politicking and delays, the credibility of the 1971 Constitutional Convention took a severe blow in May 1972 when a delegate exposed a bribery scheme in which delegates were paid to vote in favor of the Marcoses – with First Lady Imelda Marcos herself implicated in the alleged payola scheme.

Ever since the convention was convened, the "progressive bloc" of the convention believed that Marcos was influencing the proceedings through the votes of delegates allied to the Marcoses and Imelda's family, the Romualdezes.  This suspicion was further strengthened on May 19, 1972, when Eduardo Quintero – a former Ambassador to the United Nations and the elected Constitutional Convention delegate for Leyte's first district – alleged that some of the delegates, including himself, had been receiving money from a "Money Lobby" in the convention. In his speech on the plenary, Quintero accused fellow delegates that were for the moment unnamed of bribing him P11,150 to vote in support of provisions that would prolong the political career of the Marcoses and against those that would hamper it. The major provisions that would have greatly impacted the political surivival of the Marcos family were the proposals to a shift to parliamentarianism which would have enabled President Marcos to run as Prime Minister unhampered by the term limits set in the presidential system of the 1935 constitution as well as the "Ban Marcos" provisions of Napoleon Rama. Quintero himself was politically indebted to the Marcoses because he was elected with the aid of Imelda Marcos' brother, but he said that he finally wanted "to do the correct thing".

Quintero eventually released a three-page sworn statement that named 14 persons involved in the bribery scheme. The list included 12 of Quintero's fellow Convention delegates, the wife of delegate Artemio Mate, and Imelda Marcos.

The exposé tainted the convention, angered the anti-Marcos opposition, and scandalized the country.  Manila drivers plastered signs reading "Mabuhay Quintero!" ("Long Live Quintero!") on the sides of their cars in the days after Quintero's exposé.  Later historians note that this would have jeopardized any efforts on Marcos' part to hold on to power beyond the two four-year terms allowed him by the 1935 Constitution, but the social unrest brought about by Marcos' 1970 debt crisis enabled him to stay in power anyway – by declaring martial law.

September 1972 bombing 
On September 18, 1972, the convention was targeted by one of the last 1972 Manila bombings – about 20 explosions in various locations in Metro Manila in the months after the Plaza Miranda bombing and immediately preceding Marcos' declaration of martial law.

Arrest of opposition delegates 

The work of the convention was affected by the declaration of martial law in September 1972 by President Marcos. The military units assigned to implement the law were given a list of 400 individuals to arrest, consisting mostly of outspoken critics of Marcos' administration.  This included a number of members of the Constitutional Convention.

Some of the individuals on the list, such as Raul Manglapus, were either not in the Philippines when martial law was declared, while some, such as Raul Roco, were in the country but managed to evade arrest. However, numerous members of the Constitutional Convention's opposition bloc were among those arrested in the early hours of September 22, 1972. Convention delegates immediately arrested after the proclamation of martial law included:
 Napoleon Rama, who was also associate editor of the Philippines Free Press
 Jose Mari Velez, who was also an ABS-CBN broadcaster
 Bren Guiao
 Natalio Bacalzo
 Jose "Joecon" S. Concepcion Jr.
 Ernesto Rondon
 Jose "Pepito" Nolledo
 Teofisto "Tito" Guingona Jr.
 Alejandro "Ding" Lichuaco
 Voltaire Garcia and George Viterbo, who were later released

As recounted by oppositionist Convention delegate Caesar Espiritu, officials privy to variations of the priority arrest list eventually informed them which other Convention delegates had been put on the list.  Aside from those actually arrested, one "shortlist" of 12 delegates identified six other delegates: Sonny Alvarez, Antonio "Tonypet" Araneta, Romy Capulong, Boni Gillego, Raul Manglapus, and Raul Roco. (Among those actually arrested, this list named Garcia, Guiao, Lichauco, Rama, Rondon, and Velez.)

The longest list the convention delegates were able to piece together listed a total of 32 delegates, identifying Bacalzo, Guingona, Concepcion, Nolledo, and Viterbo who were all arrested, and additionally mentioned "Delima (the only girl), Occeña, Badoy, Sanchez, the Espiritu brothers, Pepe Calderon, Kalaw, Father Ortiz, and Amatong".

With nearly a dozen of its members in jail and some of its most prominent leaders overseas or in hiding, the "progressive faction" of the convention which spoke against Marcos was no longer able to contribute to the discussion.

Revised new draft Constitution
In contrast to the slow, contentious deliberations that marked its early days, the Convention moved quickly after Marcos had declared martial law. The opposition bloc had effectively been decimated and the threat of imprisonment hung over any delegates who might voice opposition in the convention.  Macapagal thus allowed the regular rules of the convention to be suspended so that a 166-member group headed by Marcos-supporting delegate Gilberto Duavit came up with a new draft of the Constitution.

By November 29, 1972, a little over two months after the declaration of martial law, the Convention approved the draft, with Macapagal "reluctantly putting his signature" on a document that would give so much power to Marcos. It was presented to  Marcos at the Malacañang palace on December 1, 1972, marking the end of the Constitutional Convention's task.

1973 constitutional plebiscite and the Ratification Cases

On January 5, 1973, Marcos, who had seized legislative power as part of his declaration of martial law, issued Presidential Decree No. 86-A, an addendum to the Revised Barrio Charter (Presidential Decree No. 86) which he had signed in late December to reconstitute Philippine barrios (villages) into a new structure called a "barangay". Presidential Decree No. 86-A cancelled the election plebiscite in which Philippine citizens would have voted whether or not to ratify the new Constitution. Instead, the 1973 Constitution would be ratified using "Citizen's Assemblies".

The Constitution was supposedly presented for the people's ratification in the 1973 constitutional plebiscite, where the Citizen's Assemblies supposedly showed their assent through viva voce votation.  Due to the lack of reportage accompanying the gagging of the Philippine press during martial law, there are no reliable records of how many citizens actually participated in these assemblies. The results of the plebiscite were thus questioned before the Philippine Supreme Court in what came to be known as the Plebiscite Cases (Planas v. COMELEC (1973)), and the legality of the 1973 Constitution questioned in what came to be known as the Ratification Cases (Javellana v. Executive Secretary).

In the Ratification Cases, six of the 10 members of the court (the Chief Justice, and Justices Makalintal, Zaldivar, Castro, Fernando, and Teehankee) said that the 1973 Constitution had not been ratified validly. But Justices Makalintal and Castro said that the people had acquiesced to the 1973 Constitution whether or not the ratification was valid, saying that the question of whether the Constitution could be invalidated was a political determination and not a judicial one. The Constitution was thus effectively upheld.

Marcos would continue to rule as a dictator until being ousted by the People Power Revolution in 1986.

See also 
Timeline of the Marcos dictatorship
1970 Philippine Constitutional Convention election
Ratification Cases

References 

Constitutional conventions (political meeting)
Political history of the Philippines
Constitutional Convention
Presidency of Ferdinand Marcos
1971 conferences